Chapel Oaks-Cedar Heights was a census-designated place in Prince George's County, Maryland during the 1970 United States Census. It consisted of the communities of Chapel Oaks and Cedar Heights. The population in 1970 was 6,049. The census area dissolved in 1980 and has not been reorganized since. The ZIP code serving the area is 20743.

Geography
Located at 38.906236 north and 76.911198 west, the census area of Chapel Oaks-Cedar Heights was bordered by Cheverly to the northeast, Kentland to the east, Seat Pleasant to the south and  Fairmount Heights to the southwest.  The land area of the CDP was 1 square mile and a population density of 6,049 persons per sq. mi.

References

Populated places in Prince George's County, Maryland
Former census-designated places in Maryland
Washington metropolitan area